Kirillovka is a rural locality (a selo) in Ustyansky Selsoviet, Burlinsky District, Altai Krai, Russia. The population was 14 as of 2013. It was founded in 1911. There is 1 street.

Geography 
Kirillovka is located 72 km east of Burla (the district's administrative centre) by road. Bogatskoye is the nearest rural locality.

References 

Rural localities in Burlinsky District